The Glory (1994) is the sequel to The Hope written by American author Herman Wouk.

Plot introduction
Interweaving the lives and fates of fictional characters and real-life notables, the sequel to The Hope continues the story of Israeli history to the climactic events of the Yom Kippur War and the promise of peace.

Historical events in the book include:
 The sinking of the Israeli ship Eilat by Soviet rockets fired by the Egyptian Navy.
 The War of Attrition.
 The Yom Kippur War. 
 Operation Entebbe.
 The visit of Anwar Sadat to Israel.

Families whose history is chronicled in The Glory:
 Barak-Berkowe-Berkowitz
 Nitzan-Bloom-Blumenthal
 Luria
 Pasternak

Real historical personages in the novel include Yonatan Netanyahu, Golda Meir, Ariel Sharon, Anwar Sadat, Moshe Dayan, and David Elazar.

See also 
Joseph Blumenthal

1994 American novels
American historical novels
Novels by Herman Wouk
Novels set in Israel
Little, Brown and Company books